Suliko Kakabadze (born 18 May 1978) is a retired Georgian football striker.

References

External links

1978 births
Living people
Footballers from Georgia (country)
FC Merani Tbilisi players
FC Dinamo Batumi players
FC Torpedo Minsk players
FC Naftan Novopolotsk players
FC Smorgon players
Interas-AE Visaginas players
Association football forwards
Expatriate footballers from Georgia (country)
Expatriate footballers in Belarus
Expatriate sportspeople from Georgia (country) in Belarus
Expatriate footballers in Lithuania
Expatriate sportspeople from Georgia (country) in Lithuania